Peter Deißenberger (born 1 December 1976) is a German former football player. He made his debut on the professional league level in the Bundesliga for Eintracht Frankfurt on 29 September 2000 when he came on as a substitute in the 57th minute in a game against Borussia Dortmund.

References

External links 
 

German footballers
Eintracht Frankfurt players
Eintracht Frankfurt II players
SV Elversberg players
1976 births
Living people
Bundesliga players
Association football midfielders
Sportspeople from Würzburg
Footballers from Bavaria